Adaland (also known as the Modisett Mansion) is a historic house located at Berryburg, Barbour County, West Virginia.

Description and history 
It was built in 1868 and is a two-story, "L"-shaped, Greek Revival style brick house. It sits on a cut fieldstone foundation on top of a hill with an excellent view of the surrounding hills, farms, mines, and gardens. Also on the property are a contributing carriage house (1872) and 19th century barn. The property was purchased by West Virginia Supreme Court of Appeals Justice Ira E. Robinson in 1920. It is open as a historic house museum.

It was listed on the National Register of Historic Places in 1995. In 1996, the house and surrounding properties were donated to the City of Philippi, West Virginia by a nearby coal company. The house is now maintained by a private non-profit organization and is open for various types of tours, teas, weddings, luncheons, dinner theaters, and other occasions.

References

External links
 Adaland Mansion - official site
Wonderful West Virginia article on Adaland Mansion

Greek Revival houses in West Virginia
Historic house museums in West Virginia
Houses completed in 1868
Houses in Barbour County, West Virginia
Houses on the National Register of Historic Places in West Virginia
Museums in Barbour County, West Virginia
National Register of Historic Places in Barbour County, West Virginia